Dominic Thiem was the defending champion and chose not to defend his title, as he was still competing at the 2020 US Open.

Miomir Kecmanović won his first ATP Tour title, defeating Yannick Hanfmann in the final, 6–4, 6–4.

Seeds

Draw

Finals

Top half

Bottom half

Qualifying

Seeds

Qualifiers

Qualifying draw

First qualifier

Second qualifier

Third qualifier

Fourth qualifier

Fifth qualifier

Sixth qualifier

References

 Main draw
 Qualifying draw

Generali Open Kitzbühel - Singles
2020 Singles